Vernon Township, Indiana may refer to one of the following places:

 Vernon Township, Hancock County, Indiana
 Vernon Township, Jackson County, Indiana
 Vernon Township, Jennings County, Indiana
 Vernon Township, Washington County, Indiana

See also

Vernon Township (disambiguation)

Indiana township disambiguation pages